Hoàng Khánh Ngọc (born 17 March 1985 in Hải Dương) is a student and a model who was the gold medal winner of Vietnam Super Model Award 2004 and represented Vietnam in Miss Universe 2004. She attended Kent International College and is now living in Sydney, Australia.

Pageants

Hoàng Khánh Ngọc and Lê Hải Anh won gold-prize Vietnam Supermodel.
Hoàng Khánh Ngọc competed at Miss Universe 2004 but unplaced. She was the first Vietnam's representative at this competition.
After that, she returned in Miss Universe Vietnam 2008 and placed Top 10.

References

1985 births
Living people
Miss Universe 2004 contestants
Vietnamese beauty pageant winners
Vietnamese female models
People from Hải Dương province
Vietnamese emigrants to Australia